Yevgeniy Ivanovich Chazov (10 June 1929 – 12 November 2021) was a physician of the Soviet Union and Russia, specializing in cardiology, Chief of the Fourth Directorate of the ministry of health, academic of the Russian Academy of Sciences and the Russian Academy of Medical Sciences, a recipient of numerous awards and decorations, Soviet, Russian, and foreign.

Biography
Chazov was born in 1929. He was a graduate of the Kiev Medical Institute. Following his graduation he worked as a clinic surgeon, and later joined the research institute of therapy of the USSR Academy of Medical Sciences. He served as a managing director of the A. L. Myasnikov Research Institute. Chazov was the director of the Moscow cardiological center since 1976. It is  one of the largest such centers in the world, comprising 10 separate institutes. As the chief of the fourth directorate of the Ministry of Health, which took care of Soviet leaders, he was widely regarded to be a person responsible for the health of the Soviet leadership, although he sometimes denied that he was their "personal physician". He was the deputy health minister and appointed minister of health in 1987. Chazov was a member of the central committee of the Communist Party.

In his book of memoirs, Health and Power he described many circumstances concerning the health of the Soviet leaders and of some leaders of the Soviet satellites.

Nobel Peace Prize
Yevgeniy Chazov was a co-founder and co-president of International Physicians for the Prevention of Nuclear War. Charged with promoting research on the probable medical, psychological, and biospheric effects of nuclear war, the group was awarded the Nobel Peace Prize on 10 December 1985. On the occasion of the award, Chazov gave the acceptance speech in Oslo. At that time the group represented more than 135,000 members from 41 countries.  Many groups protested the decision to include Chazov, and alleged that Chazov was responsible for some of the Soviet abuses of psychiatry and medicine and for attacks against a 1975 recipient of the Nobel Peace Prize, the physicist and Soviet dissident Andrei D. Sakharov.

Personal life
Chazov was married three times. He had two daughters, Tatyana and Irina, from the first and second marriage, respectively.

Legasy
On December 16, 2022, a monument to the founder of "Kremlin medicine" - cardiologist Evgeny Chazov was erected on the territory of the Moscow Central Clinical Hospital of the Presidential Administration of the Russian Federation.

References

External links 

 Acceptance speech on the occasion of the award of the Nobel Peace Prize in Oslo (10 December 1985)
 Nobel Lecture (11 December 1985)
 

1929 births
2021 deaths
Russian cardiologists
Soviet cardiologists
People from Nizhny Novgorod
Soviet Ministers of Health
Full Members of the USSR Academy of Sciences
Full Members of the Russian Academy of Sciences
Academicians of the USSR Academy of Medical Sciences
Academicians of the Russian Academy of Medical Sciences
Members of the Serbian Academy of Sciences and Arts
Foreign Members of the Bulgarian Academy of Sciences
Members of the Tajik Academy of Sciences
Soviet anti–nuclear weapons activists
Russian anti–nuclear weapons activists
Full Cavaliers of the Order "For Merit to the Fatherland"
Recipients of the Lomonosov Gold Medal
Heroes of Socialist Labour
Recipients of the Order of Lenin
Lenin Prize winners
Recipients of the USSR State Prize
State Prize of the Russian Federation laureates
Bogomolets National Medical University alumni
Léon Bernard Foundation Prize laureates
Foreign members of the Serbian Academy of Sciences and Arts